The Diggers Rest Football Netball Club, nicknamed the Burras, is an Australian rules football and netball club  and is located 38 km north west of Melbourne in the town of Diggers Rest and is affiliated with the Riddell District Football League.

The club first played in the  Riddell District Football League in 1978, and lost their first game to Broadford by 260 points. The club's first win was in 1979 when they defeated Lancefield by 10 points.

Premierships
 Riddell District Football League
 Seniors: 2016, 2018
 Seniors Div 2: 1993
 Reserves: 2013, 2016, 2018
 Reserves Div 2: 1992
 U18: 2002

References

External links
 SportsTG website

Riddell District Football League clubs
Netball teams in Victoria (Australia)
Sport in the City of Melton
Australian rules football clubs in Victoria (Australia)